WSSO (1230 AM) is a radio station licensed to the city of Starkville, Mississippi. It is owned by Cumulus Media, through licensee Cumulus Licensing LLC, and broadcasts a sports format known as 1230 The Team. The station carries programming from CBS Sports Radio.

1230 AM is a local Class C frequency within the 48 states, and stations on this frequency are allowed to broadcast 24 hours per day.

WSSO has used the same call letters since it began broadcasting.

References

External links

Radio stations established in 1949
SSO
1949 establishments in the United States
Sports radio stations in the United States